This is a list of schools located in the city of Gurugram, formerly known as Gurgaon, in Haryana, India. Note that this article refers to schools in the territorial limits of the city of Gurugram, not from the district of Gurugram.

Management institutes 

 BML Munjal University
 GD Goenka University
 Great Lakes Institute of Management (GLIM)
 Infinity Business School
 The NorthCap University
 Management Development Institute (MDI)
 Sushant School of Art and Architecture
 Sushant University

Schools 
 
 
 Alpine Convent School
 Blue Bells Model School
 Gurugram Public School
 Heritage Xperiential Learning School
 Kendriya Vidyalaya AFS Gurgaon
 Lancers International School
 Ryan International School
 SCR Public School
 Shalom Hills International School
 The Shri Ram School
 Vega Schools

IB School 
International Baccalaureate schools in Gurgaon district include:-

 Lancers International School  
 Scottish High International School

CBSE schools 
The table below shows the secondary schools affiliated with the CBSE within the district of Gurgaon.

ICSE Schools 
MatriKiran School

 Scottish High International School
VIBGYOR High School in Gurgaon

See also 
 List of institutions of higher education in Haryana

References

Schools in Gurgaon
Gurgaon
Gurgaon
Education in Gurgaon
Haryana-related lists